The following articles contain lists of cities in the United States of America:

 Lists of populated places in the United States - Lists of U.S. cities by state
 List of United States cities by population
 List of United States cities by area
 List of United States cities by elevation
 List of most populous cities in the United States by decade
 List of United States cities by population density
 List of United States cities by Spanish-speaking population
 Lists of United States cities with large ethnic minority populations
 List of the most common U.S. place names

Cities